Tampines 1 is a shopping mall located in the east of Singapore next to the Tampines MRT station. The mall opened on 1 April 2009.

Overview
Construction work on the mall began in March 2007 after the DBS Tampines Centre was demolished. It replaced the former DBS Tampines Centre and Pavilion Cineplex. The mall obtained TOP on 31 March 2009 and was opened to public on the following day.

The mall, spread over five storeys and one basement, is the first suburban mall in Singapore with a dedicated swimming pool. The shopping mall is located at the Tampines Regional Centre, where Tampines MRT station and Tampines Bus Interchange are situated very close to the mall. It is also located next to Century Square Shopping Centre as well as Tampines Mall.

The total development cost of the project was estimated to be S$450 million and the building was upgraded from 17 March 2012 to 10 November that year. Times Bookstores was replaced by MUJI, Manpuku was replaced by Daiso and Sony Style was replaced by MOF My Izakaya.

Tampines 1 had received such changes. In September 2014, Payless ShoeSource was closed down, replaced by Sephora. In March 2015, New Look was closed down, replaced by Browhaus. In 2017, both Forever New and Topshop were replaced by The Editor's Market, UOB Bank and HSBC Bank due to high rental. With the closure of all Esprit stores on 7 April 2020, Playdress took over the space. Uniqlo had their first flagship store at Tampines 1 from April 2009 until 17 January 2021. Don Don Donki took over the uniqlo and browhaus shop space and will be opening on 22 October 2021.

Tampines 1 tenants include Sephora, Pepper Lunch, Muji, Daiso, Challenger, 4Fingers Crispy Chicken, Sushi Express and Awfully Chocolate.

Controversy
Tampines 1 received criticism for sending a racially discriminatory email to a potential tenant.

References

External links
 

Shopping malls in Singapore
Tampines